Sven Schmid (born 21 January 1978) is a German fencer. He won a bronze medal in the team épée event at the 2004 Summer Olympics.

References

1978 births
Living people
German male fencers
Olympic fencers of Germany
Fencers at the 2004 Summer Olympics
Olympic bronze medalists for Germany
Olympic medalists in fencing
Sportspeople from Johannesburg
Medalists at the 2004 Summer Olympics